Donald Paul Rutherford (born 1957) is a Canadian philosopher and a professor of philosophy at the University of California, San Diego. He is known for his research on early modern philosophy.
Rutherford is a former president of Leibniz Society of North America (2010-14) and a winner of its Essay Prize (1992). He is an editor of Oxford Studies in Early Modern Philosophy.

Books
 Leibniz and the Rational Order of Nature, Cambridge University Press, 1995
 The Leibniz-Des Bosses Correspondence, Latin edition, English translation with Introduction and Notes (with Brandon Look), Yale University Press, 2007
 Leibniz: Nature and Freedom, edited with Introduction (co-editor J.A. Cover), Oxford University Press, 2005
 The Cambridge Companion to Early Modern Philosophy, edited with Introduction, Cambridge University Press, 2006
 Oxford Studies in Early Modern Philosophy, co-editor (with Daniel Garber): vol. 6 (2012), vol. 7 (2015), vol. 8 (2018); editor: vol. 9 (2019)

References

Canadian philosophers
Philosophy academics
Living people
Descartes scholars
Spinoza scholars
Gottfried Wilhelm Leibniz scholars
University of California, San Diego faculty
University of California, Berkeley faculty
1957 births
Hobbes scholars